Mar Thoma College, Chungathara was established in 1981, by the Malankara Mar Thoma Syrian Church. It is situated at Chungathara, Malappuram district, and is affiliated to University of Calicut.

Recognition and accreditation
Mar Thoma College, Chungathara, has been accredited  and assessed by National Assessment and Accreditation Council (NAAC) at B++ level.

Courses
UG PROGRAMS:
 B.Com Cooperation
 B.A Economics
 B.Sc Physics
 B.Sc Computer Science
 B.Sc Botany
 B.Sc Maths
 B.Sc Polymer Chemistry
 BBAPG PROGRAMS M.A. Economics
 M.ComDOCTORAL PROGRAMS'''
 Ph.D Commerce

Notable alumni
 M. Swaraj, Former Member of Kerala Legislative Assembly

See also

References

External links
Mar Thoma College, Chungathara
University of Calicut
University Grants Commission
National Assessment and Accreditation Council

Colleges in Kerala